Michel Bertraneu (born 26 October 1949) is a French equestrian. He competed in two events at the 1984 Summer Olympics.

References

External links
 

1949 births
Living people
French male equestrians
French dressage riders
Olympic equestrians of France
Equestrians at the 1984 Summer Olympics
Place of birth missing (living people)